Chen Lei may refer to:

Chen Lei (Heilongjiang), Chinese politician, former governor of Heilongjiang
Chen Lei (PRC Minister) (born 1954), Chinese politician, Minister of Water Resources
Chen Lei (footballer) (born 1985), Chinese football player
Chen Lei (musician), guitarist of the Chinese band Tang Dynasty
Chen Lei (singer) (born 1963), Taiwanese singer

See also
 Lei Chen (1897–1979), Chinese politician
 Cheng Lei